The Dance of Lifey Death is a graphic novel created by Eddie Campbell and published by Dark Horse Comics.

External links
 Review of Three-Piece Suit (includes entirety of The Dance of Lifey Death)
 Review in The Comics Journal of Three-Piece Suit 

Dark Horse Comics titles